Monogononta is a class of rotifers, found mostly in freshwater but also in soil and marine environments.  They include both free-swimming and sessile forms.  Monogononts generally have a reduced corona, and each individual has a single gonad, which gives the group its name.  Males are generally smaller than females, and are produced only during certain times of the year, with females otherwise reproducing through parthenogenesis.

Their mastax is not designed for grinding. They produce mictic and amictic eggs. The class contains 1,570 species.

References

External links 

 Rotifer World Catalog, by C.D. Jersabek & M.F. Leitner

 
Eurotatoria
Protostome classes